Euripides Pants were a group consisting of local Austin musicians, some of whom later joined the hard rock band Ministry.

Discography
Way Up Off In There (1995, Sweatbox)

"Way Up Off In There", and their second unreleased album, "Fumble on the two yard line", can be heard on https://maxbrodyworld.bandcamp.com

Trivia
Paul Leary, seminal member of The Butthole Surfers and local Austin-ite, produced this record. He has stated that this is his favorite production he has ever done.

References 
 Official MySpace site

Punk rock groups from Texas